Happy Michelin Kitchen is a 2012 Taiwanese romantic-comedy television series. The television drama was produced by Anhui Television International Media Ltd., starring Lan Cheng-lung and Cheryl Yang. The shooting began during mid-June 2011, and first aired on January 23, 2012 on Anhui Television.

Synopsis
An Shao Cheng (Lan Cheng Long) is a second generation restaurateur who is supposed to take over their restaurant after he was fooled about his mother's death. He, then meets and falls in love with an ordinary looking but extraordinarily skilled chef, Xin Duo Duo (Cheryl Yang).

Cast

Main
Lan Cheng-lung as An Shao Cheng 
Cheryl Yang as Xin Duo Duo 
Li Jin Ming as Li Ru Zhen 
Wu Jian Fei as Gu Da Peng 
Ying Er as Zhou Jia Qi 
Li Zhi Nan as Ding Wei Gang

Supporting
Li Yi Feng as Xiang Yu Chao 
Liu Chao as Ding Wei Ming
Lu Yi-ching as Xiao Qing
Li Sheng Rong as Li Yi Yang 
Xu Zhi He as Xiao Qiang 
Fan Xiao Po as Lu Mei Ci 
Zhou Da Qing as Zhou Jing 
Yan Jing Yao (as Ye Min Fang 
Dong Zhi Cheng as Na Bai Chuang 
Chen You Fang as Zeng Cui Hua 
Marie Zhuge as Cai Shan
An Dong Ni as Tao Zhe Ming 
Wang Jing Qiao as Meng Xiao Fei 
Abe Tsuyoshi as store manager
Lu Jia Xing as Song Xin Xin

Guest appearances
from Happy and Love Forever
Ming Dao as Yi Ding Qiang 
Annie Chen as Pan Xiao Nuo

from Sunny Happiness
Mike He as Xiang Yu Jie 
Janine Chang as Fang Yong Yong

Broadcast

Multimedia
Happy Michelin Kitchen did not release any soundtrack. However, there are songs used in the series. In particular, the series had nine songs from different artists, released in their respective albums. The opening theme song used is "This Time: :Love You" or "Zhe Yi Ci Ai Ni" by COLOR band, while the ending theme song used is by Chen Si Han entitled "Shuo Ai Bu Ai".

Track listing

Episode ratings
Happy Michelin Kitchen ranked fourth in its pilot episode, until it gradually goes to the third spot in the last series, with a total average of 0.56. Its drama competitors were TTV's Love Forward, CTS's I Love You So Much and Alice in Wonder City, and FTV's Skip Beat! and Absolute Darling. The viewers survey was conducted by AGB Nielsen.

Further reading
 楊謹華拍戲求逼真 遭酒瓶砸身
情人節藍正龍曾下廚 楊謹華愛煮夫
3生3旦捧《三顆星》

References

External links
 Happy Michelin Kitchen  on CTV
 Happy Michelin Kitchen on Sina
 Happy Michelin Kitchen on Anhui Television

China Television original programming
2012 Taiwanese television series debuts
2012 Taiwanese television series endings
Taiwanese romantic comedy television series
Anhui Television original programming